"Miss Me", a song by Drake featuring Lil Wayne from Drake's album Thank Me Later.

Miss Me may also refer to:

Miss Me?, a 2007 album by Korean singer Crown J
"Miss Me" (Mohombi song), a song by Mohombi featuring Nelly from the 2010 album MoveMeant
Miss Me?, a 2016 EP by Korean girl band I.O.I
"Miss Me", a song by Gotthard from their 2017 album Silver
"Miss Me" (MoStack song), a 2020 song by MoStack featuring AJ Tracey

See also
"Miss Me x 100", a TV episode
Did You Miss Me? (disambiguation)